Multiple Choice is the debut album by Argentine rock band Pork. The only single off the album is "Akira" which found considerable radio airplay upon release and video rotation.

Track listing
"Akira" (Barrabia) - 4:42
"Bloody Mary" (Barrabia) - 5:04
"Two To Tango" (Barrabia) - 5:00
"Why You?" (Barrabia) - 5:33
"Fear Your Lies" (Barrabia) - 4:44
"The Wake" (Barrabia) - 4:16
"Hazardous Dangerous" (Barrabia) - 5:44
"Multiple Choice" (Barrabia) - 4:44
"Johnny On The Spot" (Barrabia) - 4:26
"Pretending" (Barrabia) - 4:19
"Trauma" (Barrabia) - 4:05
"Arabic" (Barrabia) - 4:34

External links
 Pork's Official Site
 Pork's Official MySpace
 Pork's Official Spanish Site

2008 albums